Amy Jones may refer to:
 Amy Jones (cricketer) (born 1993), English cricketer
 Amy Jones (writer), Canadian writer
 Amy Jones (artist) (1899–1992), American artist and muralist
 Amy Holden Jones (born 1955), American screenwriter and film director